Midsland is the second-largest village on the Dutch island of Terschelling in the province of Friesland, the Netherlands. It had a population of around 1,018 in January 2017.

A statue was placed near the village in 1982 commemorating Het Stryper Wyfke, an old crone who deceived English troops and saved the island's civilian population during Holmes's Bonfire in 1666.

Sources
Municipality guide Terschelling 2005-2006

References

Populated places in Friesland
Terschelling